The Ravenden Springs School is a historic school building on Ash and Wells Streets in Ravenden Springs, Arkansas.  It is a large single-story fieldstone structure with a hip roof, built in 1941.  It has Craftsman styling, notable in its front porch, and grouping of windows on the sides.  The building was used as a school until 1974, and went through a number of ownership changes before its reacquisition by the town in 1990.

The building was listed on the National Register of Historic Places in 2004, at which time it was being adapted to house town offices.

See also
National Register of Historic Places listings in Randolph County, Arkansas

References

School buildings on the National Register of Historic Places in Arkansas
School buildings completed in 1941
Buildings and structures in Randolph County, Arkansas
National Register of Historic Places in Randolph County, Arkansas